is a Japanese animation studio based in Suginami, Tokyo.

History
The studio was founded on June 1, 2021, with Yokohama Animation Laboratory serves as the studio's cooperation partner.

Works

Television series

References

External links

  
 

Cloud Hearts
Animation studios in Tokyo
Japanese animation studios
Japanese companies established in 2021
Mass media companies established in 2021
Suginami